The Ballad of Beta-2 is a 1965 science fiction novel by American writer Samuel R. Delany.
The book was originally published as Ace Double M-121, together with Alpha Yes, Terra No! by Emil Petaja. The first stand alone edition was published in 1971.
In 1977 a corrected edition came out, in a hardcover edition published by Gregg Press with an introduction by David G. Hartwell.

Plot
The story is about the history of an ill-fated multi-generational interstellar expedition of discovery. Some of the ships were broken and all passengers killed by some unknown force, only their broken shells arriving at the destination. In others the passengers survived, but by the time the spaceships arrived at the destination star system, it has long since been settled through the already developed FTL ships. The descendants were incapable of and uninterested in settling on the system's planets, showed themselves extremely hostile to any outsiders entering their ships, and were left alone – to continue living in the spaceships as an obscure backwater culture isolated from broader human history. 
 
The degenerate "Star Folk" and their culture arouse little interest among the flourishing interstellar human culture. Only one researcher had bothered to record their songs, these being dismissed as "derivative" due to their repeated reference to "cities", "desert" and other Earth-bound concepts. However, an Anthropology professor charges a promising student with looking deeper, pointing out that these were the only humans to ever actually cross the depths of space between the stars, since later FTL ships are able to simply bypass these depths. The professor's intuition proves amply right.

The student, for his thesis, is charged with investigating the source and antecedents of a ballad which begins 

On arriving at the spot, the student finds the present day Star Folk in themselves just as much of an uninteresting dead end as had been supposed – but he still makes very startling and important discoveries. First, he encounters a kind of "child" with supernatural powers – teleportation, living in a vacuum, and more. Then he discovers the records left by earlier passengers, from which he pieces out the tragic history of these ships. This forms the bulk of the book, with the student being in effect just the frame story.

It turns out that in the early generations, the voyage went well, the fleet of generation ships proceeding as planned. It was at this time that Earth-bound terms got new meanings, "A City" being one of the ships and "The Desert" being the space between them. However. in later generations a fanatic religious ideology arose – its main tenets being that the ships' mission was "To Bring Human Beings to the Stars", that the term "Human Being" was to be defined according to a very strict "Norm" covering both physical characteristics and social behavior – and that anyone not fitting that "Norm" was not a true "Human Being" and had to be weeded out. Fanatic Judges were set up to judge such misfits and almost invariably sentence them to death, with the Judges increasingly usurping the authority of the Captains. Misfits escaped to the weightless areas at the core of the ships, where they could easier avoid capture, and which in effect became a kind of ghetto.

Into this already perilous situation came a new dire threat – some kind of mysterious force destroying the ships one by one. The book's main protagonist, the courageous woman Captain of the ship Beta-2, heard a desperate plea for help from another ship and went to help. There she discovered that the destruction was caused by a mysterious being living in deep space, and that its destructive acts were not deliberate malice but miscalculated efforts to communicate with humans, who were completely beyond all its experience. Shouting "Stop!", the Captain managed to establish communications with the deep space being, and make it stop, saving her own ship and most of the others.

To her shock and surprise, the deep space being spoke in her mind, saying "I love you" – having learned from her mind what humans understood by "love" and in a way transformed itself into a "he". The ensuing encounter left her pregnant, and eventually giving birth to a Wonder Child – the being which the student would much later encounter. However, a woman being pregnant was a clear violation of the Judges' "Norm", as on the ships new humans were born only artificially, being chosen by prospective parents in the genetic "market" referred to in the ballad. Thus, after giving birth the Captain was judged and executed. And having thus completely overthrown the Captains' authority. the Judges and their followers embarked on a wholesale hunt and extermination of all misfits. Eventually, only those fitting the "Norm" were left – their descendants being completely degenerate at the journey's end.

However, the Miracle Child, born of the Deep Space being and the Captain, was there – able and willing to greatly facilitate spaceborne Humanity in making contact with newly discovered alien species and cultures.

Religious themes

The book's plot includes a re-enactment of some of the main themes of Christian theology - the Annunciation, Mary becoming  miraculously pregnant and her giving birth to the miraculous Jesus Christ. The similarity is made explicit at the end of the book, with the book's Miracle Child stating "I and My Father are One" – repeating words uttered by Jesus. However, in this re-telling of the story it is the Mary-analogue who is crucified and martyred, rather than her son.

References

Sources

External links
 

Novels by Samuel Delany
1965 American novels
1965 science fiction novels
American science fiction novels
Generation ships in fiction
Novels about racism
Religion in science fiction